Bonaventura Fauni-Pio (1496-1562) was a Roman Catholic prelate who served as Bishop of Acqui (1549–1558).

Biography
Bonaventura Fauni-Pio was born in Costacciaro, Italy in 1496 and ordained a priest in the Order of Friars Minor Conventual. In 1543, he was appointed Minister General of Order of Friars Minor Conventual. On 9 Apr 1549, he was appointed during the papacy of Pope Paul III as Bishop of Acqui. On 28 May 1549, he was consecrated bishop. He served as Bishop of Acqui until his resignation in 1558. He died in Gubbio, Italy in 1562. 

While bishop, he was the principal co-consecrator of Antonio Bernardo de Mirandola, Bishop of Caserta (1552).

References 

16th-century Italian Roman Catholic bishops
Bishops appointed by Pope Paul III
1496 births
1562 deaths
People from the Province of Perugia